Sino Satellite Communications Co., Ltd. known also as SinoSat is a Chinese company.

It provided satellite communications through a pair of communications satellites in geostationary orbit. Their two satellites were, SinoSat 1 and SinoSat 3. A third satellite, SinoSat 2, failed shortly after launch.

History
Sino Satellite Communications was formed in 1994. It was a subsidiary of China Aerospace Science and Technology Corporation (CASC). In 2007, a new joint venture was formed with another state-owned company China Satellite Communications, which SinoSat 1 and other assets was injected to the joint venture as share capital. However, in 2009 China Satellite Communications was assigned as a subsidiary of CASC by the State-owned Assets Supervision and Administration Commission of the State Council (excluding some assets that were assigned to China Telecommunications Corporation). Since then, Sino Satellite Communications became a subsidiary of China Satellite Communications, with all the satellites were under the brand ChinaSat instead.

In 2016 Sino Satellite Communications sold a 15% stake of a company to Shenglu Telecommunication.

Satellites

SinoSat 1
Sinosat-1 was built by Aérospatiale using a Spacebus 3000 satellite bus. It was launched by a Long March 3B carrier rocket from the Xichang Satellite Launch Centre at 09:20 GMT on 18 July 1998. It was placed into a geostationary orbit, and is currently operating in a slot at 110.5° East of the Greenwich Meridian. It was redesignated Chinasat 5B.

SinoSat 1C
SinoSat 1C was the brand name of Apstar 2R/Telstar 10 in China.

SinoSat 1D
SinoSat 1C was the brand name of Telstar 18 in China.

SinoSat 2

Sinosat-2 was based on the DFH-4 bus. It was launched at 16:20 GMT on 28 October 2006, also using a Long March 3B. After launch, its solar panels and communications antenna failed to deploy, making the satellite unusable.

SinoSat 3
Sinosat-3 is a DFH-3 satellite, which was launched at 16:08 GMT on 31 May 2007. A Long March 3A rocket was used to place it into geosynchronous transfer orbit, making the 100th flight of a Long March rocket. It operates in geostationary orbit at 125° East. It was redesignated ChinaSat 5C.

SinoSat 5
Launched in 2011. Renamed to ChinaSat 10

SinoSat 6
Launched in 2010 by a Long March 3B rocket. Renamed to ChinaSat 6A.

Shareholders
According to the company website, Sino Satellite Communications was owned by several state-owned companies, namely China Aerospace Science and Technology Corporation (CASC), CITIC Group and China Financial Computerization Corporation. However, CASC owned 99.26% stake directly and indirectly.

See also
ChinaSat
List of Long March launches

References

Communications satellite operators
Aerospace companies of China
China Aerospace Science and Technology Corporation
Communications satellites of China
CITIC Group